Betazole (also known as ametazole) is a histamine H2 receptor agonist. Betazole hydrochloride is known as gastramine and histalog.

It has been used as a gastric stimulant to test for maximal production of gastric secretion activity. The test can be used in diagnosis of diseases such as Zollinger-Ellison syndrome where there is excess acid production, in this case driven by over production of gastrin. The volume of acid secretion is measured following administration of betazole, diagnosis being secretion greater than 60% of the maximal acid secretion following betazole stimulation. This procedure can lead to complications and should be avoided in subjects with coronary artery disease. It is also used in diagnosis of gastritis in association with a test for secretin activity.

Betazole is used as a stimulant in preference to histamine because of its specificity for the H2 receptor and its advantage of not generating the undesirable side effects that histamine would induce. It therefore does not require concomitant use of antihistaminic compounds to block the actions of histamine at other histamine receptor types.

It is used to test the effectiveness of H2 receptor blocking drugs such as nizatidine.

References

Amines
Pyrazoles